Shadrinsky District is an administrative and municipal district (raion), one of the twenty-four in Kurgan Oblast, Russia. It is located in the northwest of the oblast. Its administrative center is the town of Shadrinsk (which is not administratively a part of the district). Population:  33,331 (2002 Census);

Administrative and municipal status
Within the framework of administrative divisions, Shadrinsky District is one of the twenty-four in the oblast. The town of Shadrinsk serves as its administrative center, despite being incorporated separately as a town under oblast jurisdiction—an administrative unit with the status equal to that of the districts.

As a municipal division, the district is incorporated as Shadrinsky Municipal District. Shadrinsk Town Under Oblast Jurisdiction is incorporated separately from the district as Shadrinsk Urban Okrug.

References

Notes

Sources

Districts of Kurgan Oblast
